Casabianca Island is a low, rocky island lying in Neumayer Channel  northeast of Damoy Point, Wiencke Island, in the Palmer Archipelago. It was discovered by the French Antarctic Expedition under Jean-Baptiste Charcot, 1903–05, who named it for Monsieur Casabianca, then French Administrator of Naval Enlistment.

See also 
 List of Antarctic and sub-Antarctic islands

References 

Islands of the Palmer Archipelago